Samson Abu (born 18 December 1969) is a Ghanaian politician and member of the Sixth Parliament of the Fourth Republic of Ghana representing the Lawra Constituency in the Upper West Region of Ghana.

Personal life 
Abu is married with four children. He is a Christian (Catholic).

Early life and education 
Abu was born on 18 December 1969 and hails from Dikpe - Lawra in the Upper West Region. He attended the University of Ghana where he earned his Bachelors' degree in Administration in 2004.

Politics 
Abu is a member of the National Democratic Congress and the Member of Parliament for the Lawra Constituency from 2013 to 2017.

He was a committee member for Education, Youth, Sports and Culture and Judiciary.

Independent candidacy 
In 2016, Abu defected from the NDC and became an independent candidate after he was defeated by Bede Ziedeng in their primaries.

Employment 
Abu was a Ghana Health Service Administrator at the Lawra Hospital. He was at the Office of President as a DCE from April 2005 to January 2013. He was a teacher with Ghana Education Service from 1994 to 2000. He is a health worker.

References 

Living people
Ghanaian Roman Catholics
National Democratic Congress (Ghana) politicians
1969 births
Ghanaian MPs 2013–2017
University of Ghana alumni